José Luis Gómez Gonzales [Chile] (March 23, 1909 – December 1, 1992) was a utility infielder in Major League Baseball who played between  and  for the Philadelphia Phillies (1935–36) and Washington Senators (1942). Listed at 5' 10" and 165 lb., Gómez batted and threw right-handed. He was the first Latino to play for the Phillies and the second Mexican-born person to play in the Major Leagues. 

In his three-season MLB career, Gómez was a .226 hitter (142-for-627) with 56 runs and 50 RBI in 200 games, including nine doubles, three triples, and three stolen bases. Gómez did not hit a home run. He made 203 infield appearances at second base (126), shortstop (76) and third base (1). He had an extensive career in the Mexican League as both a player and manager before retiring in 1953.

Gómez died in Nuevo Laredo, Tamaulipas, Mexico at age 83.

References

External links

1909 births
1992 deaths
Baseball players from Sinaloa
Major League Baseball infielders
Major League Baseball players from Mexico
Mexican Baseball Hall of Fame inductees
Mexican expatriate baseball players in the United States
People from Mazatlán Municipality
Philadelphia Phillies players
Washington Senators (1901–1960) players